Sara Rose Diamond is an American sociologist and attorney, and the author of four books that "study and expose the agenda and tactics of the American political right wing."

Biography
After graduating from the University of California at Irvine, Diamond earned a Ph.D. from U.C. Berkeley in sociology. Having conducted research since the early 1980s, her Ph.D. dissertation, entitled "Right-Wing Movements in the United States, 1945-1992",  served as the basis for her second book, Roads to Dominion. 

Her book, Not by Politics Alone: The Enduring Influence of the Christian Right, was reviewed by Booklist, Kirkus Reviews, Library Journal, and Publishers Weekly.

She has taught journalism and sociology at several California universities, and for several years wrote a regular column for Z Magazine. She is also known for her critique of the US Institute of Peace.

Diamond then switched careers, attending the Hastings College of Law, from which she graduated in 2003.

The Bancroft Library at U.C. Berkeley maintains the Sara Diamond Collection on the U.S. Right, an archive of the materials she assembled about the conservative movement in the United States. University publications have described it as one of the largest collections of its type in the country.

Works
Spiritual Warfare: The Politics of the Christian Right, South End Press, Boston. 1989.
Roads to Dominion: Right-Wing Movements and Political Power in the United States, Guilford Press, New York. 1995. 
Facing the Wrath: Confronting the Right in Dangerous Times, Common Courage Press, Monroe, Maine. 1996.
Not by Politics Alone: The Enduring Influence of the Christian Right, Guilford Press, New York. 1998.

Reviews
Nation, April 26, 1999, Abby Scher, "Political Chapter, Bible Verse," p. 30.
Women's Review of Books, December, 1999, Kathleen M. Blee, "Right Makes Might," pp. 5–6.

References 

Contemporary Authors Online, Gale, 2006. Reproduced in Biography Resource Center. Farmington Hills, Mich.: Thomson Gale. 2006.

External links 
 Sara Diamond’s homepage as an attorney
 
 Sara Diamond Collection on the U.S. Right at Bancroft Library at Online Archive of California

American political writers
American lawyers
American sociologists
Living people
Year of birth missing (living people)
University of California, Irvine alumni
UC Berkeley College of Letters and Science alumni
American women sociologists
American women lawyers
American women social scientists
American women non-fiction writers
21st-century American women